Tetmajer may refer to:

 Ludwig von Tetmajer (1850–1905), Hungarian/Swiss engineer
 Włodzimierz (Przerwa-)Tetmajer (1861–1923), Polish painter, half brother of Kazimierz
 Kazimierz Przerwa-Tetmajer (1865–1940), Polish poet, novelist, playwright, journalist, and author

See also
 Przerwa (disambiguation)

Swiss noble families
Polish noble families
Polish-language surnames
Germanic-language surnames